Jiang Kelü (born 29 April 1985) is a Chinese sabre fencer. He competed in the men's team sabre competition at the 2012 Summer Olympics. He is married to fellow Jiangsu fencer Zhu Min.

References

1985 births
Living people
Chinese male sabre fencers
Olympic fencers of China
Fencers at the 2012 Summer Olympics
Sportspeople from Wuxi
Asian Games medalists in fencing
Fencers at the 2010 Asian Games
Asian Games gold medalists for China
Medalists at the 2010 Asian Games
Fencers from Jiangsu
21st-century Chinese people